Phlebiarubrone is an antibiotic with the molecular formula C19H12O4 which is produced by the fungi Punctularia strigosozonata.

References

Further reading 

 
 

antibiotics
Benzodioxoles